The One Hundred Twentieth Ohio General Assembly was the legislative body of the state of Ohio in 1993 and 1994. In this General Assembly, the Ohio Senate was controlled by the Republicans and the Ohio House of Representatives was controlled by the Democrats.  In the Senate, there were 19 Republicans and 14 Democrats.  In the House, there were 52 Democrats and 47 Republicans.  It was the first General Assembly to use redistricted legislative districts from the 1990 United States Census.

Major events

Vacancies
April 13, 1993: Senator Harry Meshel (D-33rd) resigns.
July 1, 1993: Representative Ray Miller (D-22nd) resigns.
December 31, 1993: Senator Steven Williams (R-31st) resigns.
February 2, 1994: Senator Ted Gray (R-3rd) resigns.

Appointments
April 21, 1993: Joseph Vukovich is appointed to the 33rd Senatorial District due to the resignation of Harry Meshel
July 1, 1993: Charleta Tavares is appointed to the 22nd House District due to the resignation of Ray Miller.
January 4, 1994: Nancy Dix is appointed to the 31st Senatorial District due to the resignation of Steven Williams.
March 1, 1994: Bruce E. Johnson is appointed to the 3rd Senatorial District due to the resignation of Ted Gray.

Senate

Leadership

Majority leadership
 President of the Senate: Stanley Aronoff
 President pro tempore of the Senate: Richard Finan
 Assistant pro tempore: Eugene J. Watts
 Whip: Roy Ray

Minority leadership
 Leader: Robert Boggs
 Assistant Leader: Alan Zaleski
 Whip: Ben Espy
 Assistant Whip: Bob Nettle

Members of the 120th Ohio Senate

House of Representatives

Leadership

Majority leadership
 Speaker of the House: Vern Riffe
 President pro tempore of the House: Barney Quilter
 Floor Leader: Bill Mallory
 Assistant Majority Floor Leader: Vernon Sykes
 Majority Whip: Jane Campbell
 Assistant Majority Whip: Marc Guthrie

Minority leadership
 Leader: Jo Ann Davidson
 Assistant Leader: William G. Batchelder
 Whip: Randy Gardner
 Assistant Whip: Tom Johnson

Members of the 120th Ohio House of Representatives

Appt.- Member was appointed to current House Seat

See also
Ohio House of Representatives membership, 126th General Assembly
Ohio House of Representatives membership, 125th General Assembly
 List of Ohio state legislatures

References
Ohio House of Representatives official website
Project Vote Smart – State House of Ohio
Map of Ohio House Districts
Ohio District Maps 2002–2012
2006 election results from Ohio Secretary of State

Ohio legislative sessions
Ohio
Ohio
1993 in Ohio
1994 in Ohio